INS Baratang (T68) is the fourth and last  of the Indian Navy. It is designed for interdiction against fast moving surface vessels and for search-and-rescue operations in coastal areas and in the exclusive economic zone. Named after Baratang in the Andaman Islands, the vessel was designed and built by Garden Reach Shipbuilders and Engineers. The diesel generators on board are supplied by Cummins India. The electronic equipment on board is from Bharat Electronics Limited, ECIL, and Hindustan Aeronautics Limited.

Operations
In 2011, the ship, as part of its anti-piracy patrol, apprehended nine poachers from Myanmar in the Andaman Sea. In August 2014, Baratang was involved in the rescue of fishing vessel MFV Matha with 11 crew members on board. In 2014, the ship also visited Phuket as part of a joint naval exercise with Royal Thai Navy corvette HTMS Thayanchon alongside two Dornier 228 aircraft.

References

Bangaram-class patrol vessels
Ships built in India
2005 ships